The Sts'ailes Nation formerly known as Chehalis First Nation  is the band government of the Sts'Ailes people, whose territories lie between Deroche and Agassiz, British Columbia. The Sts'Alies are a Halkomelem-speaking people but are distinct historically and politically from the surrounding Sto:lo peoples.

Demographics
Number of Band Members: 1007

Indian Reserves
Indian Reserves under the jurisdiction of the Sts'ailes Nation include:
Chehalis Indian Reserve No. 5, on the right bank (west bank) of the Harrison River (location of the main community), 880.20 ha
Chehalis Indian Reserve No. 6, on the left bank (east bank) of the Harrison River, opposite IR No. 5, 25.5 ha.
Pekw'Xe:yles (Peckquaylis) 10.3 ha.  Shared with 23 other bands, former site of St. Mary's Indian Residential School in Mission, now an educational and business complex

Economic development
In 1974, the Sts'ailes Band had one staff member; now they have over 200 employees working for the Band and Development Corporation.

See also
 Tribal Website

References

Coast Salish governments
First Nations governments in the Lower Mainland